The 1982 UEFA European Under-21 Championship was the 3rd staging of the UEFA European Under-21 Championship. The qualifying stage spanned two years (1980–82) and had 26 entrants. West Germany competed in the competition for the first time. England U-21s won the competition.

The 26 national teams were divided into eight groups (six groups of 3 + two groups of 4). The group winners played off against each other on a two-legged home-and-away basis until the winner was decided.  There was no 3rd-place playoff.

Qualifying stage

Draw
The allocation of teams into qualifying groups was based on that of 1982 FIFA World Cup qualification with several changes, reflecting the absence of some nations:
 Group 1 did not include Albania
 Group 2 did not include Netherlands (moved to Group 8) and Republic of Ireland 
 Group 3 did not include Wales and Iceland
 Group 4 did not include Norway (moved to Group 7)
 Group 5 did not include Denmark (moved to Group 6) and Luxembourg (moved to Group 8)
 Group 6 did not include Portugal, Northern Ireland and Israel, but included Denmark (moved from Group 5)
 Group 7 did not include Malta, but included Norway (moved from Group 4)
 Group 8 composed of Netherlands (moved from Group 2), Luxembourg (moved from Group 5) and Spain (who did not participate in World Cup qualification)

 Finland 0-1 Bulgaria
 Finland 1-2 Austria
 Bulgaria 1-0 W.Germany
 W. Germany 4-0 Austria
 Bulgaria 1-0 Finland
 Finland 1-2 W. Germany
 Austria 1-2 Bulgaria
 Austria 0-0 Finland
 W. Germany 4-2 Finland
 Austria 0-1 W. Germany
 Bulgaria 1-0 Austria
 W.Germany 4-1 Bulgaria

 France 3-1 Cyprus
 Belgium 2-1 Cyprus
 Cyprus 0-1 Belgium
 France 1-0 Belgium
 Belgium 1-2 France
 Cyprus 2-1 France

 Czechoslo. 3-0 Turkey
 Turkey 2-1 Czechoslo.
 USSR    1-0 Turkey
 Turkey 0-0 USSR
 USSR    0-0 Czecho.
 Czechoslo. 0-0 USSR

 Romania 4-0 England
 England 5-0 Switzerland
 England 3-0 Romania
 Switzerland 0-1 Hungary
 Hungary 4-2 Romania
 Switzerland 0-0 England
 Hungary 1-2 England
 Romania 2-1 Hungary
 Romania 1-1 Switz.
 Hungary 5-1 Switzerland
 Switz. 3-0 Romania
 England 2-0 Hungary

 Italy 1-0 Yugoslavia
 Greece 1-3 Italy
 Yugoslavia 1-1 Greece
 Yugoslavia 1-0 Italy
 Italy 1-0 Greece
 Greece 0-2 Yugoslavia

 Sweden 2-0 Scotland
 Denmark 2-1 Sweden
 Scotland 2-1 Denmark
 Sweden 0-0 Denmark
 Scotland 4-0 Sweden
 Denmark 1-1 Scotland

 Norway 0-1 Poland
 E. Germany 0-4 Norway
 E. Germany 2-3 Poland
 Norway 1-1 E. Germany
 Poland 3-1 E. Germany
 Poland 4-0 Norway

 Netherlands 0-2 Spain
 Spain 4-1 Luxembourg
 Netherlands 1-0 Luxem.
 Luxembourg 1-5 Spain
 Luxem. 0-2 Netherlands
 Spain 2-1 Netherlands

Qualified teams

1 Bold indicates champion for that year

Knockout stages

References

External links 
 Results Archive at uefa.com
 RSSSF Results Archive at rsssf.com

UEFA European Under-21 Championship
UEFA
UEFA
1982 in youth association football